Dobrá Niva is a village and municipality of the Zvolen District in the Banská Bystrica Region of Slovakia. The village has a castle.

History
In historical records, the village was first mentioned in 1254 (Dobruna). In 1351 it was allied with the town of Sása. In the 15th century it belonged to local feudatories and, after on, to Esterházy. From 1582 to 1657 it had to pay tributes to Turks whom besieged the village in 1578, 1559 and 1663.

External links
http://www.obecdobraniva.sk/
https://web.archive.org/web/20071116010355/http://www.statistics.sk/mosmis/eng/run.html
http://www.e-obce.sk/obec/dobraniva/dobra-niva.html
http://www.hrady.sk/dobra-niva.php

Villages and municipalities in Zvolen District